Véronique Müller (born 9 February 1948, in Morat) is a Swiss singer.

Biography 

Before her musical career, she worked as Petula Clark's secretary. She also spent time in England where she was a pupil of Freddie Winrose, who was the producer of Shirley Bassey.

She represented Switzerland in the Eurovision Song Contest 1972 with the entry "C'est la chanson de mon amour" ("This the song of my love"), where she finished in 8th place. She later co-wrote Switzerland's entry in the 1980 contest, "Cinéma", performed by Paola, which placed 4th.

Discography

Albums 

 Y Usne Breitegrade (1984)
 Viviamo Per Amare (1990)
 Los E Mal... - Neui Lieder Für Chind Und Settegi Wo Gross Worde Sind (Unknown)
 Véronique Muller Presents International And Swiss Popular Songs (Unknown)
 Du (Unknown)
 Wie Du Und Ig (Unknown)

Singles & EPs 

 C'est La Chanson De Mon Amour (1972)
 Liebe, So Heisst Meine Welt (1972)
 D'Abentür Vom Bärnhard Und Bianca (Schwyzerdütschi Version) (1977)
 Easy (1978)
 Sämeli (1978)
 Chumm Uf d'Alp! = Viens Sur l'Alpe! (1979)
 Holla Trulla (1979)
 En Ardèche (Unknown)

Miscellaneous 

 Max Imal Cardinal (1998)

References 

1948 births
Living people
Eurovision Song Contest entrants of 1972
People from the canton of Fribourg
Eurovision Song Contest entrants for Switzerland
20th-century Swiss women singers
Secretaries